Adelaide Coari (4 November 1881 – 16 February 1966) was an Italian teacher, trade unionist and Roman Catholic social activist.

Born in Milan, Coari became a primary teacher. She helped found the Christian Democratic Women's Group inspired by the thought of Romolo Murri, and became editor of the Catholic Women's League's monthly journal L'Azione muliebre. In 1904 she left to start Pensiero e Azione, a fortnightly publication promoting women's unionization, and was involved in Milan's Women's Federation. In 1908 the church authorities suppressed Pensiero e Azione on suspicion of modernism, and Coari abandoned union activism for teaching and other charitable work.

References

1881 births
1966 deaths
Italian schoolteachers
Trade unionists from Milan
Italian Roman Catholics
Italian women trade unionists
Roman Catholic activists
Italian magazine founders